Concordia-Minnesota may refer to:

 Concordia University (Saint Paul, Minnesota)
 Concordia College (Moorhead, Minnesota)